Leonhard von Spengel (24 September 1803, in Munich – 8 November 1880, in Munich) was a German classical scholar.

Biography 
He attended the lyceum in his hometown, where as a pupil of Joseph Kopp and Johann von Gott Fröhlich, he was encouraged to study philology. After taking the examination for secondary school teachers in 1823, he furthered his studies in classical philology at the universities of Leipzig and Berlin, receiving his PhD at the University of Munich in 1827. He became known through his edition (1826) of Varro's De Lingua Latina and subsequently was appointed lector. As a university student his influences were Gottfried Hermann (Leipzig) and August Boeckh and Immanuel Bekker (Berlin). He turned down an offer of a professorship from the University of Kiel, and from 1830 taught classes as a gymnasium professor in Munich. From 1842 to 1847 he was professor at Heidelberg, and afterwards returned to Munich as a university professor.

In 1841 he became a full member of the Bavarian Academy of Sciences.

Published works 
Among his publications were his edition of the Ars Rhetorica ad Alexandrum, which, following Petrus Victorius, he attributed to Anaximenes of Lampsacus (1844), his edition of the Rhetoric of Aristotle (1867), and his text edition of the Rhetores Grœci (three volumes, 1853–56). His address Ueber das Studium der Rhetorik bei den Alten (1842) is a valuable outline sketch of the art of eloquence in classical times.

References 
 J. E. Sandys, A History of Classical Scholarship, volume III  (Cambridge, 1908)
 

German classical scholars
German non-fiction writers
German classical philologists
Academic staff of the Ludwig Maximilian University of Munich
Academic staff of Heidelberg University
1803 births
1880 deaths
German male non-fiction writers